"The Gunner's Dream" is a song from Pink Floyd's 1983 album The Final Cut. This song was one of several to be considered for the band's "best of" album, Echoes: The Best of Pink Floyd. The song tells the story and thoughts of an airman gunner as he falls to his death during a raid, dreaming of a safe world in the future, without war. It is one of the four songs on the video version of the album The Final Cut Video EP. In his lyrics, Waters references real-life events including the then very recent Hyde Park and Regent's Park bombings, and takes the refrain "some corner of a foreign field" from Rupert Brooke's poem The Soldier.

Reception
In a retrospective review for The Final Cut, Rachel Mann of The Quietus described "The Gunner's Dream" as the album's centerpiece; the track "tenderly imagines the lost hopes and expectations of a bomber gunner shot down and falling to his death over Berlin." Mann believed Waters' voice is "beautifully matched to words whose understatement adds to the power."

Personnel
 Roger Waters – vocals, bass, and tape effects
 David Gilmour – guitar
 Nick Mason – drums

with:

 The National Philharmonic Orchestra conducted and arranged by Michael Kamen 
 Raphael Ravenscroft – tenor sax 
 Michael Kamen – piano and electric piano
 Andy Bown – Steinway piano

See also
 List of anti-war songs

References

External links

Songs about soldiers
Songs about the military
1983 songs
Pink Floyd songs
Anti-war songs
Songs about death
Rock ballads
Songs written by Roger Waters
Song recordings produced by Roger Waters